Ōtaki Station or Otaki Station may refer to:

 Ōtaki Station (Chiba) (大多喜駅), Chiba Prefecture, Japan
 Ōtaki Station (Yamagata) (大滝駅), Yamagata Prefecture, Japan
 Otaki railway station, Wellington Region, New Zealand